Whitetail Peak is in the Beartooth Mountains in the U.S. state of Montana. The peak is one of the tallest in the Beartooth Mountains, the fifth-tallest in Montana, and is located in the Absaroka-Beartooth Wilderness of Custer National Forest.

References

Whitetail
Beartooth Mountains
Mountains of Carbon County, Montana